Live at Budokan is a live recording released by progressive metal band Dream Theater on October 5, 2004, available on either 3 CDs, 2 DVDs, or 1 Blu-ray Disc. It was recorded at the Nippon Budokan Hall on April 26, 2004 in Tokyo, Japan.

Due to time constraints, the songs "The Great Debate", "Under a Glass Moon" and "Caught in a Web", which included an extended drum solo, were removed from the setlist at the last minute. On the DVD, during the credits, an instrumental version of the song "Vacant" is played in the background.

According to the Commentary Track on their "When Dream And Day Reunite" Official Bootleg Live DVD during the first few minutes of the live concert Jordan Rudess had an equipment malfunction that played either the incorrect sound, no sound at all, or random notes  1/2-step upward in pitch.  Nevertheless, Rudess mimed playing the correct parts as he realized they would have to be re-recorded during post-production.

The live DVD was re-released on Blu-ray, on October 18, 2011.

Track listing
All music by John Petrucci, John Myung, Jordan Rudess, Mike Portnoy except where noted.
CD
Disc one

Disc two

Disc three

DVD
Disc one
The entire Budokan concert:
 "As I Am" – 8:34
 "This Dying Soul" – 12:12
 "Beyond This Life" – 19:34
 "Hollow Years" – 9:19
 "War Inside My Head" – 2:30
 "The Test That Stumped Them All" – 4:53
 "Endless Sacrifice" – 11:20
 "Instrumedley" – 12:09
 "Trial of Tears" – 13:58
 "New Millennium" – 7:59
 "Keyboard Solo" – 3:59
 "Only a Matter of Time" – 7:25
 "Goodnight Kiss" – 6:14
 "Solitary Shell"  – 5:51
 "Stream of Consciousness" – 10:55
 "Disappear" – 5:55
 "Pull Me Under" – 9:00
 "In the Name of God" – 17:36
 Credits – 3:11

Disc two
Documentary and Extra Features:
 "Riding The Train Of Thought": Japanese Tour Documentary – 29:46
 John Petrucci "Guitar World" – 6:27
 Jordan Rudess "Keyboard World" – 6:43
 Mike Portnoy Drum Solo – 12:08
 "The Dream Theater Chronicles": 2004 Tour Opening Video – 5:43
 "Instrumedley" Multiangle Bonus – 12:03

Blu-ray

Contains all content from the DVD set on one Blu-ray Disc, with the concert being presented in 1080p and remastered audio and the extra features largely in 480p.

Personnel
 James LaBrie – Lead vocals, percussion
 John Petrucci – Guitar, backing vocals
 Jordan Rudess – Keyboards
 John Myung – Bass guitar, Chapman Stick
 Mike Portnoy – Drums, backing vocals

Production
Produced By John Petrucci & Mike Portnoy
Recorded & Engineered By Nigel Paul
Assistant Engineer: Jon Belec
Mixed By Kevin Shirley
Digital Editing: Patrick Woodward
Mastered By Howie Weinberg

Charts

RIAA Certifications
These statistics were compiled from the RIAA certification online database. They only apply to the DVD.

Gold - January 26, 2005
Platinum - January 26, 2005

References

Dream Theater live albums
Dream Theater video albums
2004 live albums
Atlantic Records live albums
Atlantic Records video albums
Live video albums
2004 video albums
Albums recorded at the Nippon Budokan